Karakoçan District is a district of Elazığ Province of Turkey. Its seat is the town Karakoçan. Its area is 1,049 km2, and its population is 28,436 (2021).

Composition
There are 2 municipalities in Karakoçan District:
Karakoçan
Sarıcan

There are 88 villages in Karakoçan District:

 Ağamezraası
 Akarbaşı
 Akbulak
 Akçiçek
 Akkuş
 Akpınar
 Akyokuş
 Alabal
 Alayağmur
 Altınoluk
 Aşağıovacık
 Bağlıağaç
 Bahçecik
 Balcalı
 Bardaklı
 Başyurt
 Bazlama
 Beydere
 Bulgurcuk
 Cumhuriyet
 Çalıkaya
 Çamardı
 Çan
 Çanakçı
 Çatalyol
 Çavuşyolu
 Çayırdam
 Çayırgülü
 Çelebi
 Çıtak
 Demirdelen
 Demirtaş
 Demirtepe
 Deveci
 Doğanoğlu
 Dumluyazı
 Durmuşköy
 Gözerek
 Güllüce
 Gümüşakar
 Gündeğdi
 Hamurkesen
 Hamzalı
 İsabey
 Kalecik
 Kalkankaya
 Karaçan
 Karakoçan
 Karapınar
 Karasakal
 Kavakdere
 Kavalcık
 Keklikköy
 Kırgıl
 Kızılca
 Kızılpınar
 Kocadayı
 Koçyiğitler
 Korudibi
 Köryusuf
 Kulundere
 Kuşbayırı
 Kuşçu
 Kümbet
 Mahmutlu
 Maksutali
 Mirahmet
 Okçular
 Ormancık
 Özlüce
 Pamuklu
 Paşayaylası
 Pilavtepe
 Sağın
 Sağucak
 Sarıbaşak
 Sarıhan
 Tekardıç
 Üçbudak
 Yalıntaş
 Yenice
 Yenikaya
 Yeniköy
 Yeşilbelen
 Yoğunağaç
 Yukarıovacık
 Yücekonak
 Yüzev

References

Districts of Elazığ Province